Islingby IK is a Swedish football club located in Borlänge.

Background
Islingby IK currently plays in Division 4 Dalarna which is the sixth tier of Swedish football. They play their home matches at the Idunvallen in Borlänge.

The club is affiliated to Dalarnas Fotbollförbund. Islingby IK have competed in the Svenska Cupen on 14 occasions and have played 32 matches in the competition. The club played in the 2011 Svenska Cupen but lost 0–4 at home to Hudiksvalls ABK in the preliminary round. Their best season in the competition was in the 1994-95 Svenska Cupen when they reached the fourth round before losing 2–5 at home to IK Brage before 512 spectators.

Season to season

In their most successful period Islingby IK competed in the following divisions:

In recent seasons Islingby IK have competed in the following divisions:

Footnotes

External links
 Islingby IK – Official website
 Islingby IK on Facebook

Sport in Dalarna County
Football clubs in Dalarna County
Association football clubs established in 1935
1935 establishments in Sweden